Dr. Panda (formerly TribePlay, Chinese: 熊貓博士) is a Chinese video game developer that creates educational applications for kids on smartphones and tablets. The company is based in Chengdu, China. The company's series of Dr. Panda games includes role-playing apps aimed at children ages 5 and under. The games are available on platforms including iOS, Android, and Windows Phone.

History 
Dr. Panda expanded into 3D graphics with the release of Dr. Panda Home in 2013. It was listed as one of The Guardian's Best 20 Android Apps of the Week in 2013.

References

Video game companies established in 2011
Video game companies of China
Companies based in Chengdu
2011 establishments in China